The Taiwan Ladies Open was a professional golf tournament in Taiwan on the Ladies European Tour. 

The 54-hole event was held at the par-72 Ta Shee Golf & Country Club in early March and played only in 2001.

Winners

References

External links

Ladies European Tour

Former Ladies European Tour events
Golf tournaments in Taiwan
2001 in Taiwanese sport